Centro Studi Politici e Strategici Machiavelli (meaning "Machiavelli Centre for Political and Strategic Studies") is a right-wing think tank based in Italy, whose mission is to promote traditional values and conservative policies.

The Machiavelli Centre publishes several articles and reports on its website, and organizes events and debates about political issues. It has been founded by League MP Guglielmo Picchi; Daniele Scalea,  lecturer at Niccolo Cusano University and former advisor to Picchi when he was Deputy Minister of Foreign Affairs (2018 - 2019); and Dario Citati, at the time researcher in Political Geography at Sapienza University of Rome.

According to several media outlets, in 2018 the think tank deeply influenced the Italian government's immigration policies. In the same year, the Machiavelli Centre has been ranked among the most important right-wing think tanks in Italy, and among the four leading think tanks related to the League party.

The  minister of education Giuseppe Valditara is a member of Machiavelli’s scientific committee.

The Centre has relationships also with think tanks and foundations abroad, including the International Republican Institute and The Heritage Foundation.

References

External links
Machiavelli Center

2017 establishments in Italy
Political organizations established in 2017
Foreign policy and strategy think tanks in Europe
Political and economic think tanks based in Europe
Think tanks based in Italy
Conservatism in Italy